Kia Mahalleh may refer to:
 Kia Mahalleh, Alborz
 Kia Mahalleh, Mazandaran